William Curtis Bok (September 7, 1897 – May 22, 1962) was a Pennsylvania Supreme Court justice, philanthropist and writer. Heir to an enormous publishing fortune, he was also a devout Quaker and an avid sailor.

Early life 

Curtis Bok was born in Wyncote, Pennsylvania, a suburb of Philadelphia. His father was Edward Bok, a Dutch immigrant to the United States and editor-in-chief of The Ladies Home Journal. His mother was Mary Louise Curtis, the only child and heir of Cyrus H. K. Curtis, founder of the Curtis Publishing Company. His father won the 1920 Pulitzer Prize for biography; his mother founded the Curtis Institute of Music.

Bok was a sickly child, with a weak heart. His father wrote of taking him to the White House to meet his hero, President Theodore Roosevelt.

In 1915, Bok graduated from The Hill School in Pottstown, Pennsylvania. He attended Williams College in Williamstown, Massachusetts, but left to serve in the U.S. Navy during World War I. He returned to finish at Williams, and graduated from the University of Virginia School of Law in 1921.

Career 
Bok worked on several public service projects before forming a law partnership with Robert Dechert and Owen B. Rhodes in 1930. He served as an assistant district attorney in Philadelphia, 1929–1932, and ran unsuccessfully for district attorney in 1935. Appointed an Orphans Court judge the following year, he became president judge of the Court of Common Pleas in 1937.
 
His most famous opinion was on obscenity in literature — Commonwealth of Pennsylvania v. Gordon et al., Court of Quarter Sessions, Philadelphia, June 1948. In March 1948, the Philadelphia vice squad raided 54 booksellers, confiscating works by authors such as Erskine Caldwell, James T. Farrell, William Faulkner, and Calder Willingham. In an elegantly written opinion, Bok found that the books were "obvious efforts to show life as it is", and that Pennsylvania could not censor them:
It will be asked whether one would care to have one's young daughter read these books. I suppose that by the time she is old enough to wish to read them she will have learned the biologic facts of life and the words that go with them. There is something seriously wrong at home if those facts have not been met and faced and sorted by then; it is not children so much as parents that should receive our concern about this. I should prefer that my own three daughters meet the facts of life and the literature of the world in my library than behind a neighbor's barn, for I can face the adversary there directly. If the young ladies are appalled by what they read, they can close the book at the bottom of page one; if they read further, they will learn what is in the world and in its people, and no parents who have been discerning with their children need fear the outcome. Nor can they hold it back, for life is a series of little battles and minor issues, and the burden of choice is on us all, every day, young and old.

In 1958, he was elected a justice of the Pennsylvania Supreme Court, serving until his death.

Philanthropy
Bok served as president of the Philadelphia Orchestra Association, but resigned after its board forced the resignation of conductor Leopold Stokowski. He was an officer of the Curtis Institute of Music, and founded the Philadelphia Forum, a cultural boosterism group that sponsored lectures, concerts and art exhibits. He was a member of the Committee of Seventy, a Philadelphia watchdog organization that promoted good government.

He directed his father's American Foundation, which promoted world peace. A supporter of presidential candidate Franklin Delano Roosevelt's efforts to normalize relations between the United States and the Soviet Union, Bok made a two-month tour of Russia in 1932, then stayed on for three additional months, working in a factory and as a chauffeur. He wrote an idealistic book about life in the Socialist Republic, which landed him on the July 17, 1933, cover of Time magazine.

Writings
Bok wrote many legal opinions and made contributions to law journals. His first three novels were courtroom dramas. He was a strong opponent of capital punishment and, in Star Wormwood (1959), used the most heinous crime imaginable to argue that it was still unjustified. Bok was an avid sailor, and twice sailed a 42-foot ketch across the Atlantic Ocean. His final novel was a romance in which a sailor on a voyage reads a love letter each day.

Non-fiction
The United States and the Soviet Union (New York: The American Foundation, 1933)
American Medicine Expert Testimony Out of Court (New York: The American Foundation, 1937)
Commonwealth v. Gordon et al, the Opinion of Judge Bok, March 18, 1949 (San Francisco: The Grabhorn Press, 1949)
Freedom of the Press (Philadelphia: 1950)
Civil Liberties under Attack (Philadelphia: University of Pennsylvania Press, 1951).
Religion in Law (Philadelphia: 1953)

Fiction
Backbone of the Herring (New York: Alfred A. Knopf, 1941)
I, Too, Nicodemus (New York: Alfred A. Knopf, 1946)
Star Wormwood (New York: Alfred A. Knopf, 1959)
Maria: A Tale of the Northeast Coast (New York: Alfred A. Knopf, 1962).

Personal life 
Bok had one sibling, Cary W. Bok (1905–1970), who tried unsuccessfully to run the Curtis Publishing Company in its final years. The younger brother settled in Camden, Maine.

On May 25, 1924, Bok married Margaret (Peggy) Adams Plummer (1904-1994). They had three children: Margaret Welmoet Bok Roland Holst (1925-1998), Benjamin Plummer Bok (1926-2001), and Derek Curtis Bok (1930- ). The marriage ended in divorce in 1933.

On November 25, 1934, Bok married Nellie Lee Holt (1901–1984), the director of religious education at Stephens College for Women in Columbia, Missouri, and a peace activist who had studied with Mahatma Gandhi. They had two daughters, Rachel Bok Kise Goldman (1937- ) and Enid Curtis Bok Schoettle Okun (1939-2018).

He and his second wife altered a house in Gulph Mills, Pennsylvania, adding Art Deco interiors by Wharton Esherick (1935–1937). Demolished in 1989, some of its interiors survive at the Philadelphia Museum of Art and the Wolfsonian Museum in Miami, Florida.

Curtis Bok was interred at West Laurel Hill Cemetery in Bala Cynwyd, Pennsylvania.

Legacy
Swarthmore College awarded him an honorary degree in 1960. Jerome J. Shestack, a friend and legal colleague, wrote of Bok: "His deep and abiding sympathy for the human condition was the hallmark both of his courtroom and of his life."

Bok's papers are housed at Princeton University and the Historical Society of Pennsylvania.

His son, Derek Curtis Bok, served as dean of Harvard Law School (1968-1971), and president of Harvard University (1971-1991 & 2006-2007).

References

External links
Curtis Bok papers at Princeton University
The William Curtis Bok and Nellie Lee Holt Bok papers, which include materials on Curtis Bok's career as an attorney, judge, and author are available for research use at the Historical Society of Pennsylvania.

1897 births
1962 deaths
Curtis family
Justices of the Supreme Court of Pennsylvania
Lawyers from Philadelphia
Curtis Institute of Music people
United States Navy sailors
United States Navy personnel of World War I
University of Virginia School of Law alumni
20th-century American judges
The Hill School alumni
Williams College alumni
American people of Dutch descent
20th-century American philanthropists
American Quakers
20th-century American lawyers